Lila Leeds (born Lila Lee Wilkinson, January 28, 1928 – September 15, 1999) was an American film actress.

Early life and career
Born in Iola, Kansas, Leeds's mother located to Clovis, New Mexico where Lila lived during her teens. Lila worked the box office at the local movie theatre. She then ran away from home. She worked as a dancer in St. Louis before moving to Los Angeles. While working as a hatcheck girl at Ciro's, she met and married actor, composer, singer and conductor Jack Little. The marriage was annulled when Leeds discovered that Little was already married.

After taking an acting course at the Bliss-Hayden School of Acting, Leeds signed with Metro-Goldwyn-Mayer and began appearing in small roles. Leeds appeared in the Red Skelton film The Show-Off (1946); Lady in the Lake (1947), based on a Raymond Chandler story; and in the Lana Turner vehicle Green Dolphin Street, where she played a Eurasian who drugs the leading man and rolls him for his money. She had a small part in So You Want to Be a Detective, which was part of the Joe McDoakes series of theatrical shorts, the film being a reworking of the subjective camera style used in Lady in the Lake, in which Leeds had previously appeared.

Leeds was producer Harold Hecht's top choice to star in Kiss the Blood Off My Hands, the first film by Hecht and co-star Burt Lancaster's production company Norma Productions. Leeds was ultimately replaced by Joan Fontaine, who was already under contract with the movie's financer and distributor Universal-International Pictures.

On September 1, 1948, Leeds gained notoriety for being arrested together with actor Robert Mitchum on charges of marijuana possession. She subsequently spent sixty days in jail.

Considered a Lana Turner look-alike, Leeds was 20 years old and engaged to Turner's ex-husband Stephen Crane at the time of her arrest. Cheryl Crane, Turner and Stephen's daughter, wrote that Leeds first tried marijuana with members of Stan Kenton's orchestra and that she was introduced to heroin while in jail. After Leeds was arrested, Crane fled to Europe rather than become entangled in the scandal.

Although she starred in the Reefer Madness–style film She Shoulda Said No! (1949) following her release from jail, her acting career, unlike Mitchum's, never recovered from the scandal.

Later years
Unable to find more work in films, Leeds left California in 1949.  She moved around the Midwest where she worked in nightclubs, married and divorced twice, and had three children, Shawn, Ivan and Laura, all of whom lived in Southern California. She eventually made her way back to Los Angeles in 1966 where she studied religion, established a church and volunteered at local missions and soup kitchens.

Death
On September 15, 1999, Leeds died of a heart attack at age 71 in Los Angeles.

Filmography

References

External links
 
 Lila Leeds: Movie star mystery photo
 Screenshots of Leeds from "Lady in the Lake"
 

1928 births
1999 deaths
20th-century American actresses
American film actresses
Actresses from Kansas
Metro-Goldwyn-Mayer contract players
People from Iola, Kansas